Sienkoro is a village in the Bana Department of Balé Province in south-western Burkina Faso. The village has a population of 485.

References

External links
Satellite map at Maplandia.com

Populated places in the Boucle du Mouhoun Region
Balé Province